J. Isabel Stambaugh (August 15, 1879 – May 11, 1969) was a United States Army nurse during World War I who served on the front line at a British Causality Clearing Center out of Base Hospital No. 10. Stambaugh was one of six women who received the United States Distinguished Service Cross for her heroism during World War I.

Early life and education 
J. Isabel Stambaugh was born in Mifflintown, Pennsylvania on August 15, 1879. Stambaugh graduated from Presbyterian Hospital Nursing School in Philadelphia, Pennsylvania in 1906.

Nursing career 
Stambaugh was the head operating room nurse for two years at Presbyterian Hospital.

World War I 
Stambaugh served on the front line at British Causality Clearing Center out of Base Hospital No. 10. on a surgical team. On March 21, 1918,  Stambaugh was seriously injured during an air raid when shells dropped on an operating room during a surgery. She was cited by Field Marshal Douglas Haig for bravery under fire. After recovering from her injury she returned to her unit. Stambaugh returned to the United States April 2, 1919. Stambaugh was one of six women who received the United States Distinguished Service Cross for her heroism during World War I. She was awarded the Distinguished Service Cross on June 27, 1919 by the United States Secretary of War Newton Baker.

Later life and death 
Stambaugh died on May 11, 1969 and was buried in Mifflintown, Pennsylvania.

References 

World War I nurses
People from Philadelphia
American nurses
American women nurses
1879 births
1969 deaths